Ibrahim Fawal (1933 - 2020) was a Palestinian-American academic, former professor, and author of the historical novel On the Hills of God, about the experiences of a young Palestinian man during the Nakba, or "catastrophe" of 1948. He lived in Birmingham, Alabama.

Fawal was born in Ramallah, Palestine in 1933. He later moved to the United States, where he earned a bachelor's degree from Birmingham-Southern College and a M.A. in film from UCLA. He worked as an assistant to director David Lean during the filming of Lawrence of Arabia in 1961, before returning to Birmingham, where he became a professor of film and literature at the University of Alabama at Birmingham.

In 1996, at the age of 63, Fawal began working on his Ph.D. at Oxford University in England. His thesis, on renowned Egyptian filmmaker Youssef Chahine, was published by the British Film Institute and University of California Press in 2001. Fawal's first novel, On the Hills of God, was published in 1998 and tells the story of the Palestinian Nakba, or "catastrophe", through the eyes of a young Palestinian man named Yousif Safi. It was the recipient of the PEN Oakland/Josephine Miles Literary Award, and has been translated into Arabic and German.

According to an editorial review by Patricia Keegan Holz of Washington International, Fawal was a Christian.

References

External links
 Profile of Ibrahim Fawal at the Institute for Middle East Understanding
 Ibrahim Fawal: About the Author at NewSouth Books
 Youssef Chahine by Ibrahim Fawal at the University of California Press

1933 births
2020 deaths
American people of Palestinian descent
University of Alabama at Birmingham faculty
Writers from Birmingham, Alabama
PEN Oakland/Josephine Miles Literary Award winners
American Christians
Christians from Alabama